The Coliseo de Puerto Rico José Miguel Agrelot (English: José Miguel Agrelot Coliseum of Puerto Rico) is the biggest indoor arena in Puerto Rico dedicated to entertainment. It is located at the Golden Mile of San Juan, the island capital. It is usually referred by Puerto Ricans as the Choliseo, which is a portmanteau of the words "Coliseo" and "Cholito", in reference to Don Cholito, one of José Miguel Agrelot's characters and Agrelot's own adopted nickname.

The coliseum opened on September 4, 2004 after a prolonged construction financed by the Government of Puerto Rico. This venue is owned by the Puerto Rico Convention District Authority, a public corporation of Puerto Rico, and managed by ASM Global. It can accommodate up to 18,500 spectators and can be reached by the Hato Rey Station of the Tren Urbano system.

The arena hosted the first WWE pay-per-view event outside the continental United States, Canada and the United Kingdom when New Year's Revolution was held there in 2005. On May 26, 2011, the arena was ranked 8th on the Top 50 Arena Venues of the world and second of the West Hemisphere in worldwide ticket sales by Pollstar Magazine. As of May 2013, the arena has received over 5 million spectators, hosting more than 600 events with a gross ticket revenue around $200 million.

After the hit from Hurricane Maria, in the 2017 Atlantic hurricane season, events after mid-September 2017 were cancelled. For a while, the Choliseo was used as a warehouse and recollection center by the Government of Puerto Rico to prepare and distribute food, water and basic necessities to those affected by the deadliest and costliest hurricane in Puerto Rican history. The arena resumed hosting events in March 2018.

History

Original plans

The Coliseum was a project started during the administration of Governor Rafael Hernández Colón, initially as part of a bid to host the 2004 Olympic Games. The facility was supposed to be constructed between the Roberto Clemente Coliseum and Hiram Bithorn Stadium, about a mile and a half away from the current arena site. The Coliseum would have been used for events such as Gymnastics and Olympic Basketball had the games been held in San Juan.

Controversy
In 1997, however, Athens was selected to host the games, and the construction of the Coliseum was jeopardized. Recognizing the need for such a facility anyway, the government decided to continue the construction, this time at a site physically close to San Juan's financial district, the Golden Mile. Since the new site was adjacent to a future Tren Urbano station, the Coliseum's planners decided not to incorporate parking facilities to the arena, as to induce visitors to use mass transportation to reach it.

Political opponents of Pedro Rosselló's administration raised various objections to the original plan, claiming that the lot of land purchased for the construction would benefit some of his political party's (PNP) heaviest financial contributors. They also objected to the lack of parking space, claiming that nearby private parking operators, supposedly also money donors to Rosselló's party, would extort high parking fees from people who could not or would not use public transportation to the venue. At the time, the Tren Urbano was in its initial stages of construction; by the time the facility opened it was still under construction. Objectors would also point out that a private operator would take control of the facility under contract from the government of Puerto Rico under what was perceived as a highly expensive contract. The Rosselló administration countered by stating that previous experience with public sports facilities in Puerto Rico, which would quickly fall into disrepair at an accelerated rate requiring constant remodeling, demanded that a private entity should manage the facility. The contract's expense would be justified by bringing in an operating partner with international experience managing world-class facilities, whose reputation would ensure that performers and sport events that had never been staged in Puerto Rico could visit the island.

The Coliseum's construction was stopped for close to two years during the administration of governor Sila María Calderón, the leader of the opposition party (PPD) whose administration followed Rosselló's. She claimed that the Puerto Rican government had spent $242 million for a facility where only 42% of its scheduled project plan had been completed when she took office. The planners and constructors had overlooked the fact that a water pumping station next to the facility had been built over unstable land, and a portion of the building's foundations would have had to be redone because of this. There was even talk of demolishing what had been built and starting from scratch, which infuriated Rosselló supporters, who dismissed the suggestion as merely an excuse to spend more government money, this time to benefit the PPD's financial backers. Plans for a redesigned interior added during the Calderón administration added fuel to the intense public controversy.

Another controversy came about when Banco Popular's Ticketpop was named the ticketing distributor through an exclusive contract, almost ignoring the bid by competitor TicketCenter; Ticketpop would remain the ticketing distributor until August 28, 2019 when rising competitor Ticketera was given the exclusive contract. The original ticket vendor bidding controversy almost went to trial, as both parties argued over who would receive the contract, but the Government of Puerto Rico stood by their original contract with Ticketpop. Local producer Angelo Medina spearheaded a group that wanted the legislature to curb the managing powers of SMG (before merging to ASM Global in 2019), recently-named to oversee operations and activities, because they feared that the company's relationship with non-local television companies would limit the participation of local talent in the arena.

The Coliseum was finally inaugurated on September 4, 2004. The first major show was Van Halen, on September 13, 2004.

Dedication
The naming of the structure caused a controversy by itself. During the construction phase, plans called for the coliseum to be named simply El Coliseo de Puerto Rico (The Coliseum of Puerto Rico), but when it was also suggested that a private entity could sponsor the facility and thereby lend its name to it, most local politicians objected to the idea, since the financial scandal involving Enron reminded them that the bankrupt company had sponsored a sports facility, which was the Enron Field, later renamed Minute Maid Park in Houston.

Some politicians argued over the naming the Coliseum after a Puerto Rican celebrity. Some of the names mentioned were that of pop star Chayanne, boxer Félix "Tito" Trinidad and actor Raúl Juliá. Puerto Rican law demanded that no facility could be named after a living individual and there were talks of making an exception to the law should a living Puerto Rican icon be honored with the name.

However, the name of beloved local comedian José Miguel Agrelot was chosen when the Coliseum was near its completion. Agrelot himself had suggested the name of Rafael Hernández Marín to be used, and when someone suggested his name instead he was both surprised and concerned.

Parking and transportation

A major public parking space or garage was not included in the planning or construction for the arena. Instead, only three parking lots were constructed, one for backstage entrance for authorized talent, production, equipment, props, etc., a medium-sized lot to the West entrance mostly for handicapped and the smallest lot, access-controlled, located across the box office and nearby the light rail station; privately-owned parking lots around the Choliseo can be found and charge a fee. The Tren Urbano is by far the most used transportation mode to and from the Choliseo; the Hato Rey station, located at a short walking distance, is the only station to extend operating hours after nighttime events end until all passengers using the system have exited at the station of their respective destinations.

Awards and recognitions
On May 26, 2011, the Coliseo was ranked 8th on the Top 50 Arena Venues of the world and second of the West Hemisphere in worldwide ticket sales by Pollstar magazine, surpassing the Staples Center in Los Angeles, the American Airlines Arena in Miami, Wembley Arena in London, etc. In the first three months of 2011, the coliseum received an overwhelming number of people of over 205,000. During the first trimester, the coliseum was ranked 13 times in the 25 best arenas worldwide, according to Pollstar, Billboard and Venues Today.

Notable events held at the venue

See also
Coliseo Rubén Rodríguez
Puerto Rico Convention Center
Roberto Clemente Coliseum

References

External links

Coliseo de Puerto Rico Official Website

Basketball venues in Puerto Rico
Boxing venues in Puerto Rico
Indoor arenas in Puerto Rico
Sports venues completed in 2004
Sports venues in San Juan, Puerto Rico
2004 establishments in Puerto Rico
Buildings and structures in San Juan, Puerto Rico